Harold Isaac Dean (May 8, 1884 – April 5, 1949) was an American football and college basketball coach. He served as the head football coach at the University of Wyoming from 1909 to 1911, compiling a record of 11–12–1. Dean was he also the head basketball coach at Wyoming from 1910 to 1912, tallying a mark of. He graduate from Ohio Wesleyan University in 1907.

Head coaching record

Football

References

External links
 

1884 births
1949 deaths
Ohio Wesleyan Battling Bishops football players
Wyoming Cowboys football coaches
Wyoming Cowboys basketball coaches